István Farkas may refer to:

István Farkas (footballer) (born 1984), Hungarian footballer
István Farkas (painter) (1887–1944), Hungarian painter and publisher
István Farkas de Boldogfa (1875–1921), Hungarian nobleman and jurist